This is a list of films produced by the Ollywood film industry based in Bhubaneshwar and Cuttack in 1956:

A-Z

References

1953
Ollywood
Films, Ollywood
1950s in Orissa